is a platforming action-adventure game for the PlayStation 2, released in 2002. In the United States it was released by Atlus.

Story
The plot begins with a treasure hunter named Rumble learning about a treasure, the Dream Stone  on Sonno Island  and setting out for it. At the same time, Tumble, who is a magical dream creature called a baku, is summoned by the Dream Queen to protect dream orbs. They both come to the same island and after a strange twist of fate become partners. Bakus can exist both within the dream world and the real world, and Rumble uses Tumble to travel into different peoples' dreams searching for the dream orbs. Most of the dreams become nightmares full of dangerous monsters.

Reception

Dual Hearts received mixed reviews from critics upon its release in North America. On Metacritic, the game holds a score of 70/100 based on 17 reviews, indicating "mixed or average reviews". On GameRankings, the game holds a score of 71.44% based on 25 reviews.

Notes

References

External links

2002 video games
Atlus games
PlayStation 2 games
PlayStation 2-only games
PlayStation Network games
Matrix Software games
Video games developed in Japan